The Second Enforcement Act of 1871, sometimes called the Civil Rights Act of 1871 or the Second Ku Klux Klan Act, was a United States federal law. The act was the second of three Enforcement Acts passed by the United States Congress from 1870 to 1871 during the Reconstruction Era to combat attacks on the voting rights of African Americans from groups like the Ku Klux Klan.

Legislative history
Republican Representative John C. Churchill from New York introduced his bill H.R. 2634 in the 41st United States Congress. The bill was passed by Congress in February 1871 and signed into law by United States President Ulysses S. Grant on February 28, 1871.

References 

Anti-discrimination law in the United States
History of African-American civil rights
Reconstruction Era legislation
United States federal civil rights legislation
United States federal criminal legislation
United States federal sovereign immunity case law
42nd United States Congress